Ernest Richard Sheepshanks, also known as Dick Sheepshanks, (22 March 1910 – 31 December 1937) was an English amateur first-class cricketer, who played one match for Yorkshire County Cricket Club in 1929, and was a war correspondent, who was killed in the Spanish Civil War.

Personal
Sheepshanks was born at Arthington Hall, Leeds, Yorkshire, England. His family had made its fortune in wool. He is also buried in a churchyard at Arthington Hall.

Education and sports
Sheepshanks later attended Eton College, where he was captain of cricket, and helped them win the annual fixture against Harrow School in 1928. He attended Cambridge University from 1928 to 1931.

It was in his first year at Cambridge, in 1929, that he played for Yorkshire County Cricket Club against the University, although he never played for Cambridge University itself. Sheepshanks, as a right-handed batsman, scored 26 in his only innings.  After following on, Cambridge scored 425 for 7 and the match was drawn.

Journalism career
He joined Reuters as a journalist 16 October 1933. Sheepshanks died, aged 27, in December 1937 at Caudiel, Teruel, Spain, where he was a Reuters special correspondent at the Battle of Teruel in the Spanish Civil War, covering the war from the pro-Franco side. A shell landed just in front of the press car he was in; Bradish Johnson of Newsweek was killed outright, Eddie Neil of Associated Press and Sheepshanks were fatally wounded, but Kim Philby of The Times, much later exposed as a Soviet spy, suffered only a minor head wound.

Controversy
Decades later Tom Duprée, British honorary consul at Saint Jean de Luz, France in 1937, suggested Philby had set a bomb in the car to kill Sheepshanks before he blew his cover, but Professor Donald Read considered this highly improbable.

References

External links
Cricinfo Profile
Cricket Archive Statistics

1910 births
1937 deaths
Yorkshire cricketers
Cricketers from Leeds
Journalists killed while covering the Spanish Civil War
English male journalists
British people of the Spanish Civil War
English cricketers